Funes Mori is a surname. Notable people with the surname include:

 Ramiro Funes Mori (born 1991), Argentine footballer
 Rogelio Funes Mori (born 1991), Argentine-born footballer who plays for Mexico

Compound surnames